The following is a list of notable deaths in August 1966.

Entries for each day are listed alphabetically by surname. A typical entry lists information in the following sequence:
 Name, age, country of citizenship at birth, subsequent country of citizenship (if applicable), reason for notability, cause of death (if known), and reference.

August 1966

1 
 Hank Gowdy, American baseball player (b. 1889)
 Robey Leibbrandt, South African boxer, competed at the 1936 Summer Olympics, and convicted traitor for acts during World War II (b. 1913)
 Charles Whitman, American mass murderer (b. 1941)
 Jeremiah Mahoney, Australian and New Zealand cricketer (b. 1880)

2 
 Rudolf Antonín Dvorský, Czech bandleader (b. 1899)
 Jacques Fouques-Duparc, French diplomat (b. 1897)

3 
 Earl Blackburn, American baseball player (b. 1892)
 Lenny Bruce, American comedian (b. 1925)
 John Cockle, English-born Australian politician, member of the Australian House of Representatives (b. 1908)
 Caroline Ganley, British politician, MP (b. 1879)
 Syd James, Australian rules footballer (b. 1895)
 Jackson Keefer, American football player (b. 1900)
 Tristan Klingsor, French poet and musician (b. 1874)

4 
 Betty Arlen, American actress (b. 1909)
 Pug Cavet, American baseball player (b. 1889)
 Howard Jackson, American composer (b. 1900)
 Régis Jolivet, French philosopher (b. 1891)
 William Kovach, Canadian politician, member of the Legislative Assembly of Alberta (b. 1909)

5 
 Bian Zhongyun, Chinese educator, first victim of the Cultural Revolution (b. 1916)
 John Cairney, New Zealand anatomist (b. 1898)
 Nobby Clark, Canadian ice hockey player (b. 1897)
 Austin Diamond, English-born Australian cricketer (b. 1874)
 Rufus Goldney, Australian politician, member of the South Australian House of Assembly (b. 1883)
 Richard Hingston, British naturalist (b. 1887)
 Joseph R. Knowland, American politician, US Representative from California (b. 1873)

6 
 Edmond L. DePatie, American film industry executive (b. 1900)
 Cordwainer Smith, American author (b. 1913)

7 
 Samuel J. Battle, American police officer, first African-American police officer in New York City (b. 1883)
 George Graham, Irish-Canadian soccer player (b. 1902)

8 
 Herman Bartlett, Australian rules footballer (b. 1892)
 Teddy Billington, American racing cyclist, multiple medalist at the 1904 Olympic games (b. 1882)
 Richmond P. Hobson, Jr., American-Canadian writer (b. 1907)
 George Ludlow Lee Sr., American businessman (b. 1901)
 Ed "Strangler" Lewis, professional wrestler (b. 1891)
 Jack Lynch, Australian rugby player (b. 1910)

9 
 Axel Alfredsson, Swedish footballer, Olympic competitor (1924) (b. 1902)
 Lee Bowers, American witness to the assassination of John F. Kennedy (b. 1925)
 Henri Fescourt, French film director (b. 1880)
 Alexander Gitovich, Soviet poet and translator (b. 1909)
 William Woodbury Hicks, American philatelist (b. 1896)
 Giorgi Leonidze, Georgian writer (b. 1899)

10 
 J. C. Bloem, Dutch poet and writer (b. 1887)
 Arthur Creber, British cricketer (b. 1909)
 Chuck Dressen, American baseball player and manager (b. 1894)
 James French, American murderer (b. c. 1936)
 Maj. Alfred Cecil Herring, English recipient of the Victoria Cross (b. 1888)
 Thomas Andrew Murray Kirk, Canadian politician, member of the House of Commons of Canada (b. 1906)

11 
 Ettore Bellotto, Italian gymnast, member of the gold medal-winning team at the 1920 Summer Olympics (b. 1895)

12 
 Artur Alliksaar, Estonian poet (b. 1923)
 J. H. Conradie, South African politician and judge, Speaker of the National Assembly (b. 1897)
 Thomas Johnson, English cyclist, medalist at the 1908 and 1920 Summer Olympics (b. 1886)

13 
 Frank Chester, Canadian politician, member of the Legislative Assembly of Manitoba (b. 1901)
 Laura Gardin Fraser, American sculptor (b. 1889)
 Poul Hansen, Danish politician, Defence Minister of Denmark and Danish Minister of Finance (b. 1913)

14 
 Cora Sutton Castle, American educator (b. 1880)
 Raymond Duncan, American writer and philosopher (b. 1874)
 Alfred Kreymborg, American writer (b. 1883)

15 
 George Burns, American baseball player (b. 1889)
 Chris Cameron, Australian rules footballer (b. 1894)
 Jules Dubois, American reporter (b. 1910)
 Rafael Frontaura, Chilean actor (b. 1896)
 Jan Kiepura, Polish-born American tenor and actor (b. 1902)
 Seena Owen, American actress (b. 1894)

16 
 Carl Klæth, Norwegian gymnast, silver medalist at the 1908 Summer Olympics (b. 1887)

17 
 Bill Allington, American minor league baseball player and manager (b. 1903)
 Jean-Yves Bigras, Canadian film director and editor (b. 1919)
 Rolf Billberg, Swedish alto saxophone player (b. 1930)
 Michael Garrison, American television producer (The Wild Wild West) (b. 1922)
 Moses Hadas, American classical scholar (b. 1900)
 Kong Duen-yee, Hong Kong actor (b. 1923)
 André Lefebvre de La Boulaye, French diplomat, ambassador to the United States (b. 1876)
 Frank Livingstone, New Zealand lawn bowls player (b. 1886)
 Ken Miles, British sports car racing engineer and driver (b. 1918)

18 
 D. C. Jarvis, American physician (b. 1881)

19 
 Fritz Bleyl, German painter (b. 1880)
 Carlo Capra, Italian footballer (b. 1889)
 Roy Crick, Australian politician, member of the Victorian Legislative Assembly (b. 1904)
 Jeanne de Casalis, Basutoland-born British actress (b. 1897)
 Tajar Zavalani, Albanian historian and journalist (b. 1903)

20 
 Arthur Colvin, Australian doctor and politician, member of the New South Wales Legislative Council (b. 1884)
 Austin Diamond, American politician (b. 1874)
 Urban Huttleston Broughton, 1st Baron Fairhaven, American-born British nobleman (b. 1896)
 Fulton Lewis Jr., American broadcaster (b. 1903)

21 
 Terry Beddard, British fencer; Olympic competitor (1936 and 1948) (b. 1901)
 Jack Bisset, Australian rules footballer (b. 1900)
 Martin Dooling, American soccer player, bronze medalist at the 1904 Summer Olympics (b. 1886)
 Constance D'Arcy Mackay, American playwright (b. 1887) 
 Kuttur Mallappa, Indian politician, home minister of Coorg State

22 
 Gunnar Aaby, Danish soccer player (b. 1895)
 Benjamin C. Dawkins, Sr., American judge (b. 1881)
 Vladislav Illich-Svitych, Soviet linguist (b. 1934)
 Wade H. Kitchens, American politician, U.S. Representative from Arkansas (b. 1878)
 Erwin Komenda, Austrian automobile designer (b. 1904)

23 
 Francis X. Bushman, American actor (b. 1883)
 Guillermo Gorostiza, Spanish footballer (b. 1909)
 Mere Haana Hall, New Zealand educator (b. c. 1881)
 John C. Knox, American federal judge (b. 1881)

24 
 Malfred Bergseth, Norwegian trade unionist (b. 1895)
 Tadeusz Bór-Komorowski, Polish general and statesman (b. 1895)
 Wheezer Dell, American baseball player (b. 1886)
 Sam Faubus, American politician (b. 1887)
 Jan van der Laan, Dutch architect (b. 1896)
 Lao She, Chinese writer (b. 1899)

25 
 James Bagshaw, English football player (Derby County) (b. 1885)
 Lance Comfort, English film director (b. 1908)
 Sir John Dwyer, Australian jurist, Chief Justice and Lieutenant Governor of Western Australia (b. 1879)

26 
 Nils Asheim, Norwegian Liberal Party politician (b. 1895) 
 Art Baker, American actor (b. 1898)
 Edmund Blampied, Jersey artist (b. 1886) 
 Norm Davis, Australian rules footballer (b. 1904)
 Robert Dehler, Canadian-born Bermudan Roman Catholic bishop (b. 1889)
 Hermann Geiger, Swiss pilot (b. 1914)
 Wolfgang Langhoff, German actor and director (b. 1901)
 Joanna MacKinnon, Scottish-born New Zealand nurse (b. 1878)
 Alexander Hugh Macmillan, Canadian religious leader (b. 1877)

27 
 Mads Clausen, Danish industrialist (b. 1905) 
 John Cournos, Russian-born American and British writer (b. 1881)

28 
 Waldemar Carlsen, Norwegian writer, newspaper editor, and politician (b. 1880)
 Andrew Edmiston, Jr., American politician, United States Representative from West Virginia (b. 1892)
 Rudolf Herrnstadt, East German politician and journalist (b. 1903)*Rudolf Herrnstadt, East German politician and journalist (b. 1903).

29 
 Princess Augusta Victoria of Hohenzollern, German princess (b. 1890)
 Emil Burri, German playwright and screenwriter (b. 1902) 
 Fritz Max Cahén, German anti-Nazi (b. 1891)
 Al DeVormer, American baseball player (b. 1891)
 Joseph Egger, Austrian actor (b. 1889)
 Romy Gosz, American Polka musician (b. 1910)

30 
 John Campbell, Australian rugby player (b. 1889)
 Martin W. Clement, American railroad executive (b. 1881)
 Elise Hambro, Norwegian educator (b. 1881)
 Gus Kuhn, British motorcyclist (b. 1898)

31 
 Joyce Allan, Australian conchologist (b. 1896)
 Alexis Caron, Canadian politician, member of the House of Commons (b. 1899)
 Denzil Dean Harber, British ornithologist (b. 1909)
 Jaroslav Jirkovský, Czechoslovak ice hockey player, competed in the 1924 Winter Olympics (b. 1891)
 Armand Machabey, French musicologist (b. 1886)

References

1966-08
August 1966 events